The women's 200 metre butterfly event at the 2008 Olympic Games took place on 12–14 August at the Beijing National Aquatics Center in Beijing, China.

In front of a large home crowd inside the Water Cube, Liu Zige powered past the entire field to capture a first gold medal for the host nation in swimming. She set a new world record of 2:04.18 to cut off a 1.32-second standard set by Australia's Jessicah Schipper at the 2006 Pan Pacific Championships in Victoria, British Columbia, Canada. She also enjoyed her teammate Jiao Liuyang handing an entire medal haul for China with a one–two finish. Jiao earned a silver medal as she overhauled Schipper on the final lap, and touched the wall in 2:04.72. Meanwhile, Schipper added a second bronze to her hardware from the 100 m butterfly, outside the record time of 2:06.26.

Poland's Otylia Jędrzejczak, the defending Olympic champion, finished outside the medals in fourth place at 2:07.02. Having won a bronze medal from Athens four years earlier, Japan's Yuko Nakanishi earned a fifth spot in 2:07.32, holding off France's Aurore Mongel (2:07.36) to sixth by four hundredths of a second (0.04). Americans Elaine Breeden (2:07.57) and Kathleen Hersey (2:08.23) closed out the field.

Records
Prior to this competition, the existing world and Olympic records were as follows.

The following new world and Olympic records were set during this competition.

Results

Heats

Semifinals

Semifinal 1

Semifinal 2

Final

References

External links
Official Olympic Report

Women's butterfly 200 metre
2008 in women's swimming
Women's events at the 2008 Summer Olympics